Joseph Edward Glennon (17 October 1889 – 26 June 1926) was an English professional footballer and cricketer.

He was born in Whitwick and died in Sheffield. As a cricketer he was active in 1921 and played for Leicestershire. He appeared in two first-class matches and scored twelve runs with a highest score of 7. He was also a professional footballer and played as an inside forward for Sheffield Wednesday.

Notes

1889 births
1926 deaths
English cricketers
English footballers
Leicestershire cricketers
People from Whitwick
Footballers from Leicestershire
Cricketers from Leicestershire
Association football inside forwards
Kilnhurst Colliery F.C. players
Grimsby Town F.C. players
Denaby United F.C. players
Sheffield Wednesday F.C. players
Rotherham County F.C. players
Rotherham Town F.C. (1899) players
English Football League players